The University of Arezzo (Studium Aretino) is an Italian university founded in 1215 that is located in the town of Arezzo in the Tuscan region of Italy. It has declined in importance since it was overtaken by newer Italian universities. It has been recognized as a studium generale since early in the 13th century.

References

Arezzo
Arezzo
Buildings and structures in Arezzo